Madhuban Goenka Vidyalaya (MGV) was established after India's independence in 1947. It began as a boarding school with a full high school curriculum. The school's curriculum focused on a well-rounded education.

Description

Madhuban Geonka Vidyalaya is one of the best higher secondary residential Co-ed schools in Bankura District, West Bengal. Established in 1947 by Shri. Mohanlal Goenka who also established Indpur Goenka Vidyayatan of Bankura District, Bankura Goenka Vidyayatan of Bankura District. This school is affiliated to West Bengal Board of Secondary Education (WBBSE) for Madhyamik (10th) and to West Bengal Council of Higher Secondary Education(WBCHSE) for Higher Secondary (10+2). The main language of instruction used is Bengali.

Subjects offered

The magnanimous subjects which are offered to students are -

Facilities

 Library
 Playground
 Auditorium
Computer Labs
 Physics Lab
Chemistry Lab
 Biology Lab
Agriculture Lab
Hostels (boys only)

This school has 4 hostels that provide accommodation nearly 250 boys.

(1) Biswakabi Chhatrabas

(2) Vivekananda chhatrabas

(3) Sidhu Kanhu Chhatrabas and 

(4) Netaji and B. B. D Chhtrabas. 

(Backward Classes Welfare Department of Government of West Bengal grant for Hostel facility for SC/ST students residing in School attached Hostels.)

In the year of 1997 Madhuban Geonka Vidyalaya celebrated Golden Jubilee.

Location

It is located 9 km away from district town Bankura. Daily buses operate from Bankura Gobindanagar bus stand, and has stoppage named Madhuban Bus Stand in between Bankura - Kenjakura bus route. Nearest railway station is Chhatna Railway Station around six Kilometer from school.

See also
Education in India
List of schools in India
Education in West Bengal

References

External links
For more information please visit:- MADHUBAN GOENKA VIDYALAYA Bankura  & Madhuban Goenka Vidyalaya

High schools and secondary schools in West Bengal
Boarding schools in West Bengal
Schools in Bankura district
Educational institutions established in 1947
1947 establishments in India